The Anglican Lynch Chapel Of Ease in West Lynch, Selworthy, Somerset, England was built around 1530. It is a Grade II* listed building.

History

The chapel was built around 1503 and was used by monks from Athelney Abbey but then became a private chapel for use by the lord of the nearby manor house.

The building was used as a store for the nearby farm but was returned to religious use in the 1880s by Thomas Dyke Acland. In 1880 it was restored and the addition of a porch completed around 1904 in memory of Henry Goddard.

The parish of Selworthy is within the Porlock and Porlock Weir benefice within the Diocese of Bath and Wells.

Architecture

The stone building is supported by diagonal buttresses and has a slate roof. It has a ribbed open wagon roof.

References

Grade II* listed buildings in West Somerset
Grade II* listed churches in Somerset